Anthurium ceratiinum is a species of plant in the family Araceae. It is endemic to Ecuador.  Its natural habitat is subantarctic forests. It is threatened by habitat loss.

References

Endemic flora of Ecuador
ceratiinum
Vulnerable plants
Taxonomy articles created by Polbot